Anaspida ("shieldless ones") is an extinct group of evolutionarily underived jawless vertebrates that existed from the early Silurian period to the late Devonian period. They were classically regarded as the ancestors of lampreys. Anaspids were small marine agnathans that lacked a heavy bony shield and paired fins, but were distinctively hypocercal.

Anatomy
Compared to other prehistoric agnathan groups, such as the Heterostraci and Osteostraci, anaspids did not possess a bony shield or armor, hence their name. The anaspid head and body are instead covered in an array of small, weakly mineralized scales, with a row of massive scutes running down the back, and, at least confirmed among the birkeniids, the body was covered in rows of tile-like scales made of aspidine, an acellular bony tissue. Anaspids all had prominent, laterally placed eyes with no sclerotic ring, with the gills opened as a row of holes along either side of the animal, typically numbering anywhere from 6-15 pairs. The major synapomorphy for the anaspids is the large, tri-radiate spine behind the series of the gill openings.

Taxonomy
Now that Jamoytius and its close cohorts, i.e., Euphanerops, have been moved to Jamoytiiformes, Class Anaspida now consists of two orders, the monogeneric Lasaniida, which contains the genus Lasanius and represents a basal anaspid group, and Birkeniida, which contains all other recognized anaspid taxa.  Birkeniida is further divided into several families, including Birkeniidae, Pterygolepididae, Rhyncholepididae and Pharyngolepididae, which contain those taxa known from whole body fossils (in addition to several taxa known only from scales) and the family Septentrioniidae, whose subtaxa are known exclusively from scales.  Two recently described genera, Kerreralepis and Cowielepis, are considered to be Birkeniida incertae sedis.

A newer taxonomy based on the work of Mikko's Phylogeny Archive, Nelson, Grande and Wilson 2016 and van der Laan 2018.

 Class †Anaspida Janvier 1996 non Williston 1917
 Order †Endeiolepidiformes Berg 1940
 Family †Endeiolepididae Stensiö 1939 corrig.
 Genus †Endeiolepis Stensiö 1939
 Order †Birkeniiformes Berg 1940
 Genus †Cowielepis Blom 2008
 Genus †Hoburgilepis Blom, Märss & Miller 2002
 Genus †Kerreralepis Blom 2012
 Genus †Maurylepis Blom, Märss & Miller 2002
 Genus †Rytidolepis Pander 1856
 Genus †Schidiosteus Pander 1856
 Genus †Silmalepis Blom, Märss & Miller 2002
 Genus †Vesikulepis Blom, Märss & Miller 2002
 Family †Pharyngolepididae Kiær 1924 corrig.
 Genus †Pharyngolepis Kiaer 1911
 Family †Pterygolepididae Obručhev 1964 corrig.
 Genus †Pterygolepis Cossmann 1920 [Pterolepis Kiaer 1911 non Rambur 1838 non De Candolle ex Miquel 1840; Pterolepidops Fowler 1947] 
 Family †Rhyncholepididae Kiær 1924 corrig.
 Genus †Rhyncholepis Kiær 1911 non Miquel 1843 non Nuttall 1841
 Family †Tahulalepididae Blom, Märss & Miller 2002
 Genus †Tahulalepis Blom, Märss & Miller 2002
 Genus †Trimpleylepis Miller, Märss & Blom 2004
 Family †Lasaniidae Goodrich 1909
 Genus †Lasanius Traquair 1898
 Family †Ramsaasalepididae Blom, Märss & Miller 2003
 Genus †Ramsaasalepis Blom, Märss & Miller 2003
 Family †Birkeniidae Traquair 1899
 Genus ?†Vilkitskilepis Märss 2002
 Genus †Ctenopleuron Matthew 1907
 Genus †Saarolepis Robertson 1945 [Anaspis Robertson 1941 non Geoffroy 1762 non Thomson 1893]
 Genus †Birkenia Traquair 1898
 Family †Septentrioniidae Blom, Märss & Miller 2002
 Genus †Liivilepis Blom, Märss & Miller 2002
 Genus †Manbrookia Blom, Märss & Miller 2002
 Genus †Ruhnulepis Blom, Märss & Miller 2002
 Genus †Spokoinolepis Blom, Märss & Miller 2002
 Genus †Septentrionia Blom, Märss & Miller 2002

Notes

External links
 
 

 
Prehistoric fish classes
Paleozoic jawless fish
Llandovery first appearances
Early Devonian extinctions